Boogie is a compilation album of both previously released and unreleased tracks by American band The Jackson 5. It was released by the Motown label on January 16, 1979, after the release of the Jacksons studio album Destiny (1978) a month earlier. Boogie is considered the rarest of all Jackson 5/Jacksons releases, as not many albums were pressed and fewer were sold at the time.

Background and composition
Boogie was available for a limited time from Hip-O Select, to complement Motown's 2001 "2 Albums on 1 CD" re-issue set of the Jackson 5's albums, on which some of these songs were issued as bonus tracks. Although only 5,000 copies were pressed, the album contains the previously unreleased full 15+ minute take of the song "Hum Along and Dance". It was available for purchase on iTunes in 2014, but was since removed.

Two of the tracks on Boogie, "Love's Gone Bad" and "I Was Made to Love Her", were later featured on Michael Jackson's 1986 compilation album, Looking Back to Yesterday.

Track listing

Personnel
SIDE A

on "Love's Gone Bad"
 Written and composed: Lamont Dozier, Brian Holland, Edward Holland, Jr.
 Arrangement: David Blumberg
 Lead vocals: Michael Jackson
 Background vocals: The Jackson 5
 Producer: Hal Davis

on "I Ain't Gonna Eat Out My Heart Anymore"
 Written and composed: Laurie Burton and Pam Sawyer
 Arrangement: James Anthony Carmichael
 Lead vocals: Michael Jackson
 Background vocals: The Jackson 5
 Producer: Hal Davis

on "ABC"
 Written and composed: The Corporation
 Arrangement: The Corporation
 Lead vocals: Michael Jackson, Jermaine Jackson and Jackie Jackson
 Background vocals: The Jackson 5
 Producer: The Corporation

on "I Was Made To Love Her"
 Written and composed: Henry Cosby, Sylvia Moy and Stevie Wonder
 Arrangement: David Blumberg
 Lead vocals: Michael Jackson
 Background vocals: The Jackson 5
 Producer: Hal Davis

on "One Day I'll Marry You"
 Written and composed: Pam Sawyer and LaVerne Ware
 Arrangement: Gene Page
 Lead vocals: Michael Jackson
 Background vocals: The Jackson 5
 Producer: Hal Davis

SIDE B

on "Never Can Say Goodbye"
 Written and composed: Clifton Davis
 Arrangement: The Corporation, Gene Page and James Carmichael
 Lead vocals: Michael Jackson
 Background vocals: The Jackson 5
 Producer: Hal Davis

on "Oh, I've Been Bless'd"
 Written and composed: Lena Manns and Frank Wilson
 Lead vocals: Michael Jackson
 Background vocals: The Jackson 5
 Producer: Bobby Taylor

on "Penny Arcade"
 Written and composed: Mel Larson, Jerry Marcellino and Deke Richards
 Lead vocals: Jermaine Jackson and Michael Jackson
 Background vocals: The Jackson 5
 Producers: Mel Larson and Jerry Marcellino

on "Just Because I Love You"
 Written and composed: James W. Alexander and Willie Hutch
 Arrangement: James Carmichael
 Lead vocals: Jermaine Jackson and Michael Jackson
 Background vocals: The Jackson 5
 Producer: Hal Davis

on "Dancing Machine"
 Written and composed: Hal Davis, Don Fletcher and Dean Parks 
 Arrangement: Arthur Wright
 Bass: William Salter
 Keyboards: Joe Sample
 Drums: James Gadson
 Lead vocals: Michael Jackson and Jermaine Jackson
 Background vocals: The Jackson 5
 Producer: Hal Davis

References

External links
 Boogie Overview at www.jackson5abc.com 

1979 compilation albums
The Jackson 5 compilation albums
Motown compilation albums
albums arranged by Gene Page
Albums produced by Hal Davis
Albums produced by the Corporation (record production team)